Enzo Gabriel Ortiz (born 5 February 1997) is an Argentine professional footballer who plays as a centre-back for Brown de Adrogué.

Career
Ortiz played for Las Palmas before being signed by Lanús in 2012. He was promoted into Lanús' first-team during the 2017–18 Argentine Primera División campaign, being moved mid-season which led to him making his professional debut in a match with Belgrano, a team he supported as a youngster, on 2 February 2018. Overall, Ortiz featured eight times in 2017–18; which also included a Copa Sudamericana bow versus Sporting Cristal weeks after debuting in the league. On 28 June 2016, Primera B Nacional's Brown completed the loan signing of Ortiz. Twenty-six appearances followed for the Adrogué club.

July 2019 saw Ortiz loaned to Barracas Central. His first senior goal arrived on 10 November during a 1–1 draw with Atlanta.

On 9 February 2022, Ortiz returned to his former club, Primera Nacional side Brown de Adrogué.

Career statistics
.

References

External links

1997 births
Living people
Footballers from Córdoba, Argentina
Argentine footballers
Association football defenders
Argentine Primera División players
Primera Nacional players
Club Atlético Lanús footballers
Club Atlético Brown footballers
Barracas Central players
Club Atlético Mitre footballers
21st-century Argentine people